Sentrin-specific protease 6 is an enzyme that in humans is encoded by the SENP6 gene.

Function 

Ubiquitin-like molecules (UBLs), such as SUMO1, are structurally related to ubiquitin and can be ligated to target proteins in a similar manner as ubiquitin. However, covalent attachment of UBLs does not result in degradation of the modified proteins. SUMO1 modification is implicated in the targeting of RANGAP1 to the nuclear pore complex, as well as in stabilization of I-kappa-B-alpha (NFKBIA; MIM 164008) from degradation by the 26S proteasome. Like ubiquitin, UBLs are synthesized as precursor proteins, with 1 or more amino acids following the C-terminal glycine-glycine residues of the mature UBL protein. Thus, the tail sequences of the UBL precursors need to be removed by UBL-specific proteases, such as SENP6, prior to their conjugation to target proteins

See also 
small ubiquitin-related modifier 1

References

Further reading